Evoked activity is brain activity that is the result of a task, sensory input or motor output. It is opposed to spontaneous brain activity during the absence of any explicit task.

Most experimental studies in neuroscience investigate brain functioning by administering a task or stimulus and measure the resulting changes in neuronal activity and behavior. In electroencephalography (EEG) research, evoked activity or evoked responses specifically refers to activity that is phase-locked to the stimulus onset and is opposed to induced activity, which is a stimulus-related change in (the amplitude of) oscillatory activity.

See also 
 Event-related potential
 Spontaneous activity
 Evoked potential
 Ongoing brain activity
 Evoked field

Electroencephalography